Philautus gunungensis is a species of frog in the family Rhacophoridae. It is endemic to the Mount Kinabalu region, in Sabah (Malaysia), Borneo.

Its natural habitat is tropical montane forest at around  asl. There are no specific threats to it, and its known range is within the Kinabalu National Park. Nevertheless, its small range makes it vulnerable to stochastic events.

References

gunungensis
Endemic fauna of Borneo
Endemic fauna of Malaysia
Amphibians of Malaysia
Amphibians described in 1996
Taxonomy articles created by Polbot
Amphibians of Borneo